The PS (paddle steamer ) Comet was built in 1812 for Henry Bell, hotel and baths owner in Helensburgh, and began a passenger service on 15 August 1812 on the River Clyde between Glasgow and Greenock, the first commercially successful steamboat service on Earth.

History
Henry Bell had become interested in steam-propelled boats, and corresponded with Robert Fulton to learn from the Charlotte Dundas venture.

In the winter of 1811/1812 he got John and Charles Wood of John Wood and Company, shipbuilders of Port Glasgow, to build a paddle steamer which was named Comet, named after the "Great Comet" of 1811. The engine was made by John Robertson of Glasgow, and the boiler by David Napier, Camlachie, Glasgow (a story has it that they were evolved from an experimental little steam engine which Bell installed to pump sea water into the Helensburgh Baths). The funnel was tall and thin, serving as a mast, with a yard, allowing it to support a square sail when there was a following wind. A small cabin aft had wooden seats in front of concealed beds and a table. Comet was reported as "brightly painted, having for her figurehead a lady garbed in all the colours of the rainbow".

The double paddlewheels were found to unsatisfactory and a pair of single wheels were substituted which increased her speed to almost 7 knots.

On 15 August 1812, Bell advertised in a local newspaper "The Greenock Advertiser", that the Comet would begin a regular passenger service from that day, a distance of  each way:

On 15 August Comet made the first commercial sailing from Glasgow for Bowling, Helensburgh and Greenock, opening the era of the steamboat on the Clyde, and more widely in Britain and Europe. The fare was "four shillings for the best cabin, and three shillings for the second." As the vessel clearly had no cabins in the modern sense it is unclear what this meant.

 
The success of this service quickly inspired competition, with services down the Firth of Clyde and the sea lochs to Largs, Rothesay, Campbeltown and Inveraray within four years, and the Comet was outclassed by newer steamers. Bell briefly tried a service on the Firth of Forth.

Famous passengers

Sir Walter Scott
James Watt (in 1816, visiting his home town of Greenock in old age) – by this date Bell offered a return trip from Glasgow to Rothesay on the same day which Watt undertook.

Wreck

Bell had the Comet lengthened and re-engined, and from September 1819 ran a service to Oban and Fort William (via the Crinan Canal), a trip which took four days.  On 15 December 1820 the Comet was wrecked in strong currents at Craignish Point near Oban, with Bell on board. There were no deaths. One of the engines ended its working days in a Greenock brewery, and is now in The Science Museum in London.

Fate
In 1875, the schooner Ann was driven against a steamship at Greenock, Renfrewshire and sank. The Glasgow Herald reported a piece from the Greenock Telegraph which stated "part of the hull of the Ann was all that was left of Henry Bell's old Comet, the first steam-vessel ever to sail in European waters. Some years ago she was bought up by Smillie, of Glasgow, and Bell's old engine taken out. She was lengthened, made a schooner, and was run on the Larne trade, where she was at great favourite, and was familiarly called the 'Long Ann'. Some time since she was burnt down to the waters edge, but her hull was so good, and she was such a favourite with her owners, that they hauled her into dock and fitted her. The curious thing is, that having been built at Port-Glasgow 63 years ago, and undergoing many vicissitudes, she should, like an old weather-beaten sailor, end her days almost at the threshold of her own home."

Comet II
Bell built another vessel, Comet II, but on 21 October 1825 she collided with the steamer Ayr off Kempock Point, Gourock, Scotland.

Comet II sank very quickly, killing 62 of the estimated 80 passengers on board, including the son-in-law of John Anderson, a friend of Robert Burns. Also drowned were recently married Captain Wemyss Erskine Sutherland of the 33rd Regiment and Sarah née Duff of Muirtown. After the loss of his second ship, Bell abandoned his work on steam navigation.

Replica

A replica of the Comet, currently situated in Port Glasgow, was built by Lithgows shipyard apprentices in 1962 for the 150th anniversary of the original. As part of the anniversary celebrations the replica sailed from Port Glasgow to Helensburgh and back, accompanied by a flotilla of small ships.

In 2011, just before the original's 200th anniversary, the replica was restored by a partnership of Inverclyde Council, Ferguson Shipbuilders and an organisation called The Trust. The restoration cost £180,000.

A survey and condition report was commissioned by Inverclyde Council and reported back in 2019. The survey found that the wooden hull of the replica is in such bad condition that it is beyond economic repair, and recommended that the machinery be removed and placed in a new hull.

Notes

References

Bibliography
 Clyde Pleasure Steamers Ian McCrorie, Orr, Pollock & Co. Ltd., Greenock,

External links 

Significant Scots – Henry Bell
A history of the growth of the steam-engine
RSA Treasure Trails – The Science Museum

1812 ships
Clyde steamers
Paddle steamers of the United Kingdom
Ships of Scotland
Tourist attractions in Scotland
1820 in Scotland
Ships built on the River Clyde
Replica ships
Maritime incidents in December 1820
Maritime incidents in February 1875